Isaac le Heup  (c.1686–1747) of Gunthorpe, Norfolk, was a British diplomat and politician who sat in the House of Commons between 1722 and 1741 .

Early life
Le Heup was the eldest son of Thomas Le Heup, and his wife  Jeanne Harmon, daughter of Pierre Harmon of Caen, Normandy. His father was a Huguenot from  St. Lo, Normandy who emigrated to England on the revocation of the Edict of Nantes and settled at St. Anne's, Westminster. Le Heup married Elizabeth Lombard, daughter of Peter Lombard of Burnham Thorpe, Norfolk, tailor to Queen Anne, on 10 August 1720. He was thus connected by this marriage to Horace Walpole who was his brother-in-law. He succeeded his father in 1736.

Career
Le Heup was returned as Member of Parliament for Bodmin as a government supporter at the 1722 general election. In 1726 he was appointed British representative at the Diet of Ratisbon, but was expelled in April 1727 in a tit-for-tat reprisal for the expulsion of the Imperial minister from London. He purchased Gunthorpe Hall from the trustees of the South Sea Company in 1726. In July 1727 he was sent as envoy to Stockholm, but was rude to the Prince of Wales at Hanover   when on his way to take up his appointment and was recalled after 17 days.

Le Heup stood unsuccessfully for Parliament for Wallingford at the  1727 general election and was eventually returned for Grampound at a by-election on  31 Jan. 1732.  At the 1734 general election,  he was returned as MP for Callington, a Walpole borough. He voted with the Administration in every recorded division. He did not stand at the  1741 general election, but was appointed a commissioner of customs in  August 1741. Following the fall of Walpole.in the next year, he was dismissed from the post.

Death and legacy
Le Heup died on 25 April 1747, aged 61. He had a son and two daughters, Elizabeth and Mary.  Elizabeth married John Lloyd MP.

References

.

1680s births
1747 deaths
Members of the Parliament of Great Britain for English constituencies
British MPs 1722–1727
British MPs 1727–1734
British MPs 1734–1741
People from North Norfolk (district)